Chekkeran Oru Chilla is a 1986 Indian Malayalam-language drama film directed by Sibi Malayil, written by Priyadarshan, and produced by Shankar. It is a remake of the 1985 Hindi film Saaheb. The film stars Shankar, along with Bharath Gopi, Ambika, and Nedumudi Venu. The film has musical score by Shyam.

Plot
Unni is a promising football goalkeeper and he aims to be in the national team. He is often criticised by family members for not taking care of his family, completing his education, or making money. His sister gets a good marriage proposal, but his father does not have the financial means to fund the marriage. His sisters and brothers are stingy with money. His elder brother's wife tries to help but it doesn't help much. Unni as an unemployed youth takes responsibility in ways opportunity opens for him and that forms the climax.

Cast

Shankar as Unni
Ambika as Lathika aka Lallu
Jagathy Sreekumar as Kunjuraman aka Pulluvan aka Kavi Kunjumamman
Nedumudi Venu as Govindan, the father.
Lissy as Chinnu, the sister.
Bharath Gopi
Raghavan
M. G. Soman
Ravi Menon
Seema
Sreenath
Valsala Menon
Sukumari
Kannur Sreelatha

Soundtrack
The music was composed by Shyam and the lyrics were written by Chunakkara Ramankutty.

Trivia
This is actor Shankar's first and only home production.

References

External links
 

1986 films
1980s Malayalam-language films
Indian family films
Malayalam remakes of Hindi films
Films directed by Sibi Malayil
Malayalam remakes of Bengali films